Play is the thirteenth studio album by Taiwanese singer Jolin Tsai. It was released on November 15, 2014, by Warner and Eternal. Produced by Starr Chen, Andrew Chen, Tiger Chung, JJ Lin, and Michael Lin, it broke away from the framework of traditional Chinese albums with rich musical contents and all-encompassing themes.

It was well received by music critics, who commented that it brought international awareness to the world-class quality of Chinese dance music. It sold more than 85,000 copies in Taiwan, becoming the year's highest-selling album by a female artist and the year's fourth highest-selling album overall in the country.

The album earned 10 Golden Melody Award nominations, and it is one of the three most nominated albums in the award's history. Eventually, it won Best Mandarin Album and Best Vocal Recording Album, and Andrew Chen won Best Single Producer for "Lip Reading". On May 22, 2015, Tsai embarked on her fourth concert tour Play World Tour in Taipei, Taiwan and ended the tour on July 16, 2016 in Kuala Lumpur, Malaysia.

Background and development 
On September 14, 2012, Tsai released her twelfth studio album, Muse. It sold more than 100,000 copies in Taiwan, and it became the year's highest-selling album by a female artist and the year's third highest-selling album overall in the country. It received four Golden Melody Award nominations, including Best Mandarin Album, Best Mandarin Female Singer, Best Music Video and Song of the Year for "The Great Artist", and "The Great Artist" eventually won Song of the Year. On April 13, 2013, she concluded the Myself World Tour at Kaohsiung Arena in Kaohsiung, Taiwan. Since then, Tsai revealed that she would begin working on her new album. On July 25, 2013, Tsai went to take a one-month courses in music, dance, and other performing arts in London, England. On October 19, 2013, Tsai released the live video album Myself World Tour, and it documented the live performances at the Taipei Arena in Taipei, Taiwan during December 22–23, 2012. On November 22, 2013, Tsai said: "The album was still in the stage of listening demos, it moves forward slowly."

On January 29, 2014, it was revealed that Tsai would solely dominate the album and the album opened up the possibility of international collaboration, with a budget of more than NT$50 million. On April 4, 2014, Tsai continued to record the album which would be released in the summer of the year, and she said it would probably include her own songwriting work. On May 19, 2014, Tsai released an English song titled "Now Is the Time" to support the 2014 FIFA World Cup, and it was included on the compilation album, Pepsi Beats of the Beautiful Game. On June 10, 2014, Tsai confirmed that three songs had been recorded for the album, but she decided to re-record because she had figured out a better way to perform the songs. On June 13, 2014, Tsai recorded the theme song titled "Kaleidoscope" for the 2014 Chinese film, Tiny Times 3. On September 5, 2014, Tsai revealed the album was "almost finished", and it would be released by the end of 2014.

Writing and production 

"Play" describes a witty conception how modern people enjoy the absurd and realistic life and how pop culture influences on society. It is full a rap song rich with trap beat and dubstep breakdown. With its gentle rhythm and guitar-based melody, "The Third Person and I" depicts how modern people adopt the escapist attitude when facing the dilemma of life or love. "Medusa" contains pop sounds and trap influence, and it was the track on the album that took the longest time to produce. "We're All Different, Yet the Same" is a soulful R&B song inspired by a true story and speaks strongly for same-sex marriage. Albert Leung said: "Love is not just an abstract belief. It is a right that requires no forgiveness or consideration. None of those who oppose same-sex marriage ever imagined that some people would love their spouses longer than they could legally, they have no right to save their loved ones' lives in the name of their family." "Gentlewomen" was inspired by Simone de Beauvoir's book The Second Sex, which talks about the existentialism and feminism. It merged the genres of noise rock and alternative dance, and it combined with distorted guitar riffs as it progresses.

"Lip Reading" was inspired by Marilyn Monroe, it is a sultry ballad with trip hop influence and pounding percussion that adds to a sort of dramatic and sensual atmosphere. "I'm Not Yours" is a duet with Namie Amuro. It merged the genres of EDM and dubstep. "I Love, I Embrace" is a soft rock song that advocates a fearless attitude and courage of accepting yourself. "Phony Queen" depicts in an ironic way that modern people's exaggerated dependence on smart phones. Wyman Wong said: "What closest to modern people are not necessarily lovers but smart phones. They rely on smart phones to ask way, do job, and pick restaurant." It is an upbeat dance-pop song with house influence. "Miss Trouble" is a rap song with a trap influenced verses and a slightly operatic chorus.

Artwork and packaging 

The word "play" has multiple meanings including "script", "acting", and "performance", and Tsai described the album's title reflected her understanding of life in recent years, adding that: "Life is like a stage, you may not be able to choose your natural role, but you can make efforts, and then rewrite your own story script."

The cover art of the album's pre-order "Actress" version and a series of related promotional artworks were photographed by Marko Krunic, and the cover art features Tsai with blond curly hair in a blood-stained raincoat designed by The Blonds. The cover art of the pre-order "Medusa" version and a series of related promotional artworks feature the singer wearing the Medusa-inspired costume exclusively designed by Versace, and it was the first time that the brand designed costume for Asian artist. The artworks were photographed by CK Chan and Wing Shya.

The cover art of the album's standard edition and a series of related promotional artworks were photographed by Chen Man and directed by Wyman Wong. The cover art features Tsai wearing Lanvin's black drape faux leather bustier dress. Other artworks feature the singer wearing Comme des Garçons's grey oversized blazer with cardigan and Valentino's embroidered tulle gown. The album's package was designed by Aaron Nieh, Nieh used his skilled simple style with stylized fonts and pure black background, and the package was made up of six double-sided color printed posters in the size of 56 x 42 cm. The cover art of the album's replay deluxe international edition was photographed by Chen Man and directed by Wyman Wong.

Release and promotion 
On October 17, 2014, Tsai announced the album would be available for pre-order on October 29, 2014 and would be released on November 15, 2014. On October 28, 2014, Tsai held a pre-order promotional event in Taipei, Taiwan, and she announced that she would release a reality show titled Play Project. On November 20, 2014, she held a press conference for the album release in Beijing, China. On November 27, 2014, Tsai broadcast her reality show Play Project, and it concluded on January 21, 2015 with a total of five episodes. On December 7, 2014, Tsai held the Play Concert in Taipei, Taiwan. On February 6, 2015, Tsai released the replay deluxe international edition of the album, and it additionally includes nine music videos.

The album reached number one on the album sales charts of Taiwan's record stores and online marketplaces, including Chia Chia, Eslite, Five Music, G-Music, Kuang Nan, and Pok'elai, and it reached number one on the album sales chart of Singapore's record store, HMV. As of December 31, 2014, it has sold more than 63,837 copies in Taiwan, and it became the year's highest-selling album by a female artist and the year's fourth highest-selling album in the country. In 2014, it reached number three, numebr five, number three, and number three on the album sales chart of Pok'elai, Kuang Nan, G-Music, and Five Music, respectively. In 2015, it rached number 10 and number 15 on the album sales chart of Kuang Nan and Five Music, respectively.

Live performances 

On November 22, 2014, Tsai appeared on the CCTV's Global Chinese Music to perform "Medusa" and "The Third Person and I". On December 20, 2014, Tsai attended the fourth season of TVB's The Voice to perform "Play" in Hong Kong, China. On December 31, 2014, Tsai attended the China TV's New Year's Eve Concert in Kaohsiung, Taiwan to perform "Medusa", "The Third Person and I", "We're All Different, Yet the Same", and "Play". On February 8, 2015, Tsai performed "I'm Not Yours", "Medusa", and "Play" at the 10th KKBox Music Awards in Taipei, Taiwan. On February 12, 2015, Tsai appeared on CCTV's Chinese New Year special 2015 CCTV Web Gala to perform "Phony Queen" and "I'm Not Yours".

On March 25, 2015, Tsai performed "The Third Person and I", "We're All Different, Yet the Same", "I'm Not Yours", and "Play" at the 2015 QQ Music Awards in Shenzhen, China. On May 31, 2015, Tsai performed "I'm Not Yours", "Phony Queen", and "Play" at the 2015 Hito Music Awards in Taipei, Taiwan. On November 6, 2015, Tsai attended the Simple Life Festival in Shanghai, China to perform "Gentlewomen", "The Third Person and I", "Lip Reading", "We're All Different, Yet the Same", and "Play". On November 10, 2015, Tsai performed "Medusa" and "I'm Not Yours" at the 2015 Tmall Double 11 Carnival Night in Beijing, China. On December 12, 2015, Tsai performed "Play" at the 2015 Mnet Asian Music Awards in Hong Kong, China. On December 31, 2015, Tsai attended the Jiangsu TV's 2016 New Year's Eve Concert and performed "I'm Not Yours" and "Play". Since then, Tsai has attended a series of events and performed songs from the album.

Singles 

On October 27, 2014, the lead single "Play" was released. On October 28, 2014, Tsai released the lyrics video of "Play". On December 2, 2014, The official music video of "Play" was released, and Tsai held a promotional event for the music video at National Taiwan Museum in Taipei, Taiwan. It was directed by Muh Chen, with the budget of NT$8 million, it received acclaims from international medias including Time, GQ Spain, and Pro Motion. It reached number one the weekly most-watched charts of YinYueTai and QQ Music. It reached number one on the yearly most-watched music videos chart of YouTube Taiwan of 2014. On December 8, 2014, Tsai released the dance video of "Play".

On December 10, 2014, the single "The Third Person and I" was released. Its music video was released on December 13, 2014 and was directed by Fu Tien-yu and features Carina Lau, It reached number one on the weekly most-watched chart of YinYueTai. On January 6, 2015, "Play" and "The Third Person and I" reached number one and number eight on the 2014 Hit FM Top 100 Singles of the Year chart respectively, and it made Tsai become one of the two artists who earned the most number-one singles on the chart.

Music videos 

On September 29, 2014, Tsai released the music video of "Phony Queen", which was directed by Jeff Chang, with a budget of more than NT$6 million. On November 30, 2014, Tsai released the music video of "Medusa", which was directed by Jennifer Wu. On December 16, 2014, Tsai released the music video of "We're All Different, Yet the Same", it was produced by Leste Chen and directed by Hou Chi-jan, and it features Taiwanese actress Grace Guei, actress Ruby Lin, and actor Bryan Chang. It was adapted from a true story, and it speaks for same-sex marriage. It received reports from a series of international presses, including El País, Gay Star News, and AfterEllen.com. On December 30, 2014, Tsai released the music video of "Gentlewomen", and it was directed by Scott Beardslee and Kitt Lin.

On January 20, 2015, Tsai released the music video of "Lip Reading", and it was directed by Thomas Wyatt and Edwin Eversole. On February 3, 2015, Tsai released the music video of "I'm Not Yours", which was directed by Muh Chen. It was inspired by the ancient Chinese folk tale Banqiao San Niangzi, it features Namie Amuro and Tsai herself wearing customized Hanfu, and it was filmed at Wufeng Lin Family Mansion and Garden in Taichung, Taiwan. It reached number six on the yearly most-watched music videos chart of YouTube Taiwan of 2015. On February 6, 2015, Tsai released the music video of "I Love, I Embrace", which was directed by Thomas Wyatt and Edwin Eversole. The music video of "Miss Trouble" was directed by Michael Sun, but because the singer was not satisfied with the result and then dropped the idea of releasing the music video.

Touring 

On October 29, 2014, Tsai confirmed that she would embark on a new concert tour. On February 15, 2015, Tsai announced that the Play World Tour would begin on May 22, 2015, at Taipei Arena in Taipei, Taiwan and would be available for ticket sale on April 12, 2015. On March 29, 2015, Tsai went to Los Angeles to attend a two-week dance rehearsal, and then the entire personnel gathered in the city to begin the preparatory work. Since then, Tsai and all the dancers began a two-week rehearsal in Taipei, Taiwan. On March 31, 2015, the promotional poster of the tour was released, and it was directed by Wyman Wong and photographed by Chen Man. The concert tour collaborated with Live Nation Entertainment, and it was directed by Travis Payne and Stacy Walker.

It was reported that the budget of the tour exceeded NT$100 million, and Tsai invited Jet Tone Production to film five video interludes for the tour. Live Nation Entertainment invited 14 choreographers and held three dance auditions in Los Angeles, United States to select 12 dancers for the tour. On June 1, 2015, Tsai held a press conference for the tour in Beijing, China, and she announced that the scheduled show dates in China. Comprising 34 shows, the tour visited 23 cities in Asia and North America and concluded on July 16, 2016, in Kuala Lumpur, Malaysia at the Stadium Merdeka. On January 30, 2018, Tsai released the live video album Play World Tour, which documented the performances at Taipei Arena in Taipei, Taiwan during May 22–25, 2015.

Critical reception 

Play received generally acclaims from domestic and international music critics. The album won Golden Melody Awards for Best Mandarin Album and Best Vocal Recording Album, and the jury commented: "The entire album presented a superior level of recording skills, it's full of surprises as listening, and it gave the audience a rich listening experience", adding that: "The songwriting focused on the minority groups within the society, and it combined music with what the singer had experienced. The splendidness of the album amazed audience, and it's a new milestone of Tsai's singing career. Musically it explored new directions, and it's quite successful both auditorily and visually." Bloomberg Businessweek called Tsai the "Great Dance-Pop Artist" and described the album "thrust her into the international spotlight and made the globe know the world-level quality of Chinese dance-pop music." Hou Cheng-nan, associate professor from I-Shou University, described the album "elevated the Chinese dance-pop level, and set an insuperable high standard." DJ Mykal wrote: "Revolutions can have major effects only when they take place in the mainstream market. Tsai merged new dance music elements in the name of diva, and I believe there is a chance to have an impact on the general audience." Taiwanese songwriter Eazie Huang wrote: "Musically the album already reached another higher plateau." Taiwanese songwriter Adam Hsu wrote: "She began to speak with overtones, she began to construct consciousness, and she began to exploit the territory of her new music world."

Freshmusic gave the album 9 out of 10 stars, and it wrote that the album was "undoubtedly the benchmark work of C-pop music in 2014, and it can be the magnum opus of Tsai reaching the peak again." PlayMusic writer Danial Chang gave the album 4.5 out of 5 stars, and he described the album "broke the pop music framework, crossed the barrier between mainstream and alternative, and gave C-pop new depth and breadth." Chia Hsu from PlayMusic gave the album 5 out of 5 stars, reasoning that: "She is completely at ease with herself in dancing and playing music, and she successfully set a new high standard." Today gave the album 3.5 out of 5 stars, and it described the album was "a finely crafted electropop record". United Daily News writer Yen Fu-min described the album "built an unsurmountable obstacle for music from other Taiwanese dance-pop singers, you can hear Tsai's dedication and consideration of conceptual integrity. It's a "smart" dance-pop album from a "smart" diva." Cool-Style writer Jamie Lee described the album was "a fantastic and symbolistic work of the time. Tsai once again set a high standard for the C-pop music industry." Tencent Entertainment wrote: "The Chinese music industry has never produced a dance-pop album as great as this one, and its superior production can be comparable to the albums of same genre in the Western market."

Accolades 
On February 8, 2015, Tsai won a KKBox Music Award for Top 10 Singers. On March 25, 2015, it earned a QQ Music Award for Best Album (Hong Kong/Taiwan), and Tsai won Best Female Singer (Taiwan) and Favorite Female Singer (Hong Kong/Taiwan). On April 11, 2015, the album won a V Chart Award for Album of the Year (Hong Kong/Taiwan), and Tsai won Best Female Singer (Hong Kong/Taiwan). On May 15, 2015, the album won a Global Chinese Golden Chart Award for Album of the Year, "The Third Person and I" won Top 20 Songs, and "Play" won Hit FM Top 100 Number One Song .

On May 18, 2015, the nominees of the 26th Golden Melody Awards were announced, the album received a total nine nominations—Best Mandarin Album, Best Vocal Recording Album, Song of the Year for "Play", Best Music Video for "Play" and "We're All Different, Yet the Same", Best Music Arrangement for "Play", Best Single Producer for "Play" and "Lip Reading", and Best Album Design, and it became the album received the most nominations in the year. On May 31, 2015, Tsai won a Hito Music Award for Best Female Singer, the album won Most Weeks at Number One Album, and "Play" won Top 10 Songs and Hit FM Top 100 Number One Song.

On June 27, 2015, the album was honored with three Golden Melody Awards for Best Mandarin Album, Best Vocal Recording Album, and Best Single Producer for "Lip Reading", and it became the album received the most awards in the year. On August 23, 2015, Tsai won a Music Radio China Top Chart Award for Favorite Female Singer (Hong Kong/Taiwan) and "The Third Person and I" won Top Songs (Hong Kong/Taiwan). On September 15, 2015, Tsai was nominated an MTV Europe Music Award for Best Taiwanese Act. On November 6, 2015, Tsai won a Global Chinese Music Award for Favorite Female Singer and "Phony Queen" won Top 20 Songs.

On December 2, 2015, Tsai won an Mnet Asian Music Award for Best Asian Artist. On May 13, 2016, the album received another Golden Melody Award nomination for Best Music Video for "I'm Not Yours". Hence, the album received a total of ten Golden Melody Award nominations, and it became one of the three albums who received the most nominations in the awards' history.

Track listing

Personnel 

Song #1
 Gibson Chou – assistant producer
 Thomas Tsai – additional program dubbing
 Peggy Hsu – backing vocals arrangement
 Tiger Chung – guitar, recording engineer
 Kenny Fan – mixing engineer

Song #2
 Starr Chen – backing vocals arrangement
 Jolin Tsai – backing vocals
 AJ Chen – recording engineer
 Jaycen Joshua – mixing engineer
 Ryan Kaul – mixing assistant engineer
 Maddox Chimm – mixing assistant engineer

Song #3
 Ooi Teng Fong – assistant producer
 Andrew Chen – backing vocals arrangement
 Jolin Tsai – backing vocals
 Yeh Yu-hsuan – recording engineer
 Jaycen Joshua – mixing engineer
 Ryan Kaul – mixing assistant engineer
 Maddox Chimm – mixing assistant engineer

Song #4
 Ooi Teng Fong – assistant producer, recording engineer
 Lin Yu-hsien – piano
 Andrew Chen – rhythm arrangement, electric guitar
 Li Qi – strings director supervisor, strings arrangement
 Hu Jingcheng – strings arrangement
 Li Qi String Orchestra – strings
 Zhang Hao – concertmaster
 Yeh Yu-hsuan – recording engineer
 Zhao Huitao – recording engineer
 Dan Grech-Marguerat – mixing engineer

Song #5
 Jolin Tsai – backing vocals
 Namie Amuro – backing vocals
 Hayley Aitken – backing vocals
 AJ Chen – recording engineer
 Jaycen Joshua – mixing engineer
 Ryan Kaul – mixing assistant engineer
 Maddox Chimm – mixing assistant engineer

Song #6
 Gibson Chou – assistant producer, recording engineer
 Peggy Hsu – backing vocals arrangement
 JerryC – guitar
 Lin I-wen – bass guitar
 Tiger Chung – recording engineer
 Kenny Fan – mixing engineer

Song #7
 Chen Hsin-ying – opera vocals
 Christine Liu – backing vocals arrangement, backing vocals
 Stanley Huang – backing vocals arrangement
 Jolin Tsai – backing vocals
 Hayley Aitken – backing vocals
 AJ Chen – recording engineer
 Jaycen Joshua – mixing engineer
 Ryan Kaul – mixing assistant engineer
 Maddox Chimm – mixing assistant engineer

Song #8
 Ooi Teng Fong – assistant producer, recording engineer
 Andrew Chen – backing vocals arrangement, backing vocals
 Jolin Tsai – backing vocals
 Jaycen Joshua – mixing engineer
 Ryan Kaul – mixing assistant engineer
 Maddox Chimm – mixing assistant engineer

Song #9
 JJ Lin – vocal producer
 Shin Chou – production coordinator, recording engineer
 Christine Chien – backing vocals arrangement, backing vocals
 Kenn C – guitar, keyboard
 Joshua Lee – recording engineer
 Jerry Lin – mixing engineer

Song #10
 Michael Lin – vocal producer, recording engineer
 Jolin Tsai – backing vocals
 AJ Chen – recording engineer
 Jaycen Joshua – mixing engineer
 Ryan Kaul – mixing assistant engineer
 Maddox Chimm – mixing assistant engineer

Chris Gehringer – mastering engineer

Release history

References

External links 
 
 

2014 albums
Jolin Tsai albums
Warner Music Taiwan albums